Sheikh Mahmud Barzanji or Mahmud Hafid Zadeh (1878 – October 9, 1956) was a Kurdish leader of a series of Kurdish uprisings against the British Mandate of Iraq. He was sheikh of a Qadiriyah Sufi family of the Barzanji clan from the city of Sulaymaniyah, which is now in Iraqi Kurdistan. He was named King of Kurdistan during several of these uprisings.

Background
After World War I, the British and other Western powers occupied parts of the Ottoman Empire. Plans made with the French in the Sykes–Picot Agreement designated Britain as the mandate power. The British were able to form their own borders to their pleasure to gain an advantage in this region. The British had firm control of Baghdad and Basra and the regions around these cities mostly consisted of Shiite and Sunni Arabs.

In 1921, the British appointed Faisal I the King of Iraq. It was an interesting choice because Faisal had no local connections, as he was part of the Hashemite family in Western Arabia. As events were unfolding in the southern part of Iraq, the British were also developing new policies in northern Iraq, which was primarily inhabited by Kurds, and was known as Greater Kurdistan in the Paris (Versailles) Peace Conference of 1919. The borders that the British formed had the Kurds between central Iraq (Baghdad) and the Ottoman lands of the north.

The Kurdish people of Iraq lived in the mountainous and terrain of the Mosul Vilayet. It was a difficult region to control from the British perspective because of the terrain and tribal loyalties of the Kurds. There was much conflict after the Great War between the Ottoman government and British on how the borders should be established. The Ottomans were unhappy with the outcome of the Treaty of Sèvres, which allowed the Great War victors control over much of the former Ottoman lands through the distribution of formerly Ottoman territory as League of Nations mandates.

In particular, the Turks felt that the Mosul Vilayet was theirs because the British had illegally conquered it after the Mudros Armistice, which had ended hostilities in the war. With the discovery of oil in northern Iraq, the British were unwilling to relinquish the Mosul Vilayet. Also, it was to the British advantage to have the Kurds play a buffer role between themselves and the Ottoman Empire. All that led to the importance of Sheikh Mahmud Barzanji.

The British government promised the Kurds during the First World War that they would receive their own land to form a Kurdish state. However, the British government did not keep their promise at the end of the war, leading to resentment among the Kurds.

There was mistrust on the part of the Kurds. In 1919, uneasiness began to evolve in the Kurdish regions because they were unhappy with their current situation and in their dealings with the British government. The Kurds revolted a year later.

The British government attempted to establish a Kurdish protectorate in the region and so appointed a popular leader of the region, which was how Mahmud became governor of southern Kurdistan.

Power and revolts

Mahmud was a very ambitious Kurdish national leader and promoted the idea of Kurds controlling their own state and gaining independence from the British. As Charles Tripp relates, the British appointed him governor of Sulaimaniah in southern Kurdistan as a way of gaining an indirect rule in this region. The British wanted this indirect rule with the popular Mahmud at the helm, which they believed would give them a face and a leader to control and calm the region. However, with a little taste of power, Mahmud had ambitions for more for himself and for the Kurdish people. He was declared "King of Kurdistan" and claimed to be the ruler of all Kurds, but the opinion of Mahmud among Kurds was mixed because he was becoming too powerful and ambitious for some.

Mahmud hoped to create Kurdistan and initially the British allowed Mahmud to pursue has ambitions because he was bringing the region and people together under indirect British control. However, by 1920 Mahmud, to British displeasure, was using his power against the British by arresting British officials in the Kurd region and starting uprisings against the British. As historian Kevin McKierman writes, "The rebellion lasted until Mahmud was wounded in combat, which occurred on the road between Kirkuk and Sulaimaniah. Captured by British forces, he was sentenced to death but later imprisoned in a British fort in India." Mahmud remained in India until 1922.

Return and second revolt

With the exile of the Sheikh in India, Turkish nationalists in the crumbling Ottoman Empire were causing a great deal of trouble in the Kurdish regions of Iraq. The Turkish nationalists, led by Mustafa Kemal, were riding high in the early 1920s after their victory against Greece and were looking to take that momentum into Iraq and take back Mosul. With the British in direct control of northern Iraq after the exile of Sheikh Mahmud, the area was becoming increasingly hostile for the British officials due to the threat from Turkey. The region was led by the Sheikh's brother, Sheikh Qadir, who was not capable of handling the situation and was seen by the British as an unstable and unreliable leader.

Sir Percy Cox, a British military official and administrator to the Middle East especially Iraq, and Winston Churchill, a British politician, were at odds on whether to release the Sheikh from his exile and bring him back to reign in northern Iraq. That would allow the British to have better control over the hostile but important region. Cox argued that the British could gain authority in a region they recently evacuated, and the Sheikh was the only hope of gaining back a stable region. Cox was aware of the dangers of bringing back the Sheikh, but he was also aware that one of the main reasons for the unrest in the region was the growing perception that the earlier promises of autonomy would be abandoned and the British would bring the Kurdish people under direct rule of the Arab government in Baghdad. The Kurdish dream of an independent state was growing less likely which caused conflict in the region. Bringing the Sheikh back was their only chance of a peaceful Iraqi state in the region and against Turkey.

Cox agreed to bring back the Sheikh and name him governor of southern Kurdistan. On December 20, 1922, Cox also agreed to a joint Anglo-Iraqi declaration that would allow a Kurdish government if they were able to form a constitution and agree on boundaries. Cox knew that with the instability in the region and the fact that there were many Kurdish groups it would be nearly impossible for them to come to a solution. Upon his return, Mahmud proceeded to pronounce himself King of the Kingdom of Kurdistan. The Sheikh rejected the deal with the British and began working in alliance with the Turks against the British. Cox realized the situation and in 1923 he denied the Kurds any say in the Iraqi government and withdrew his offer of their own independent state. The Sheikh was the king until 1924 and was involved in uprisings against the British until 1932, when the Royal Air Force and British-trained Iraqis were able to capture the Sheikh again and exile him to southern Iraq.

Death and legacy

Sheikh sued for peace and was exiled in southern Iraq in May 1932 and was able to return to his family village in 1941 where he remained the rest of his years. He ultimately died in 1956 with his family. He is still remembered today with displays of him around Iraqi Kurdistan and especially in Sulaimaniah. He is a hero to the Kurdish people to this day, as he is thought of as an pioneering Kurdish nationalist who fought for the independence and respect of his people. He is regarded as a pioneer for many future Kurd leaders.

See also
Kingdom of Kurdistan
RAF Iraq Command

References

External links
Ethnic Cleansing and the Kurds
The Rebellion of Sheikh Mahmmud Barzanji, in German

1878 births
1956 deaths
People from Sulaymaniyah
Iraqi Kurdistani politicians
Kurdish people from the Ottoman Empire
Iraqi Kurdish people
Kurdish rulers
Kingdom of Kurdistan
Kurdish nationalists
Kurdish revolutionaries
Burials in Iraq
Iraqi exiles
Iraqi expatriates in India
Iraqi revolt of 1920